Abdenour Keramane was the Algerian minister for industry and mines in the 1992 government of Belaid Abdessalam.

References 

Possibly living people
Year of birth missing (living people)
Algerian politicians